was a Japanese painter and printmaker of the Torii school, in the genre of ukiyo-e. Like the other Torii artists, his primary focus was on Kabuki billboards, advertisements, actor prints, and other related material. Many scholars believe Kiyomasu to have been the younger brother or son of Torii Kiyonobu I, one of the founders of the school, or to have been an alternate art-name (gō) for the same man.

In the 1710s, prints signed with Kiyomasu's name far outnumber those with the signature of Kiyonobu. If the two were distinct artists, this could indicate that the elder artist, the head of the school, devoted more time to the kabuki billboards and other works which were more the official province of the workshop, while the younger was left to do prints. On the other hand, even if the two were the same person, this could simply be explained by the use of different names on different types of work.

Though his style is said to be somewhat more graceful than Kiyonobu's, they are difficult to tell apart, as are most works by other Torii artists. However, there are certain stylistic elements that do stand out as differences between the two artists. While Kiyonobu's work was based largely on that of Hishikawa Moronobu, and was very masculine in nature, with sharp, bold lines, Kiyomasu's works, while very similar at first glance, are in fact softer and more graceful; they are said to show a "lack of seriousness of intent". This shift is attributed to an emulation of the styles of Moronobu's chief competitor, Sugimura Jihei.

See also
Torii Kiyomasu II

References
 Lane, Richard. (1978).  Images from the Floating World, The Japanese Print. Oxford: Oxford University Press. ;  OCLC 5246796

Ukiyo-e artists
Japanese printmakers
Torii school